Brian Thomas Wenzel (born 24 May 1929) is an Australian former actor, comedian, director and singer. He has been in the entertainment business for 75 years, including circus, stage, television and film (including made for TV movies and theatrical release films).
 
After numerous character roles in Crawford Productions serials and films and after appearing in serial Certain Women, he was cast in the permanent  role  of Sgt. Frank Gilroy, he played from 1981 and 1993.
 
He had a small role in 1995 in serial Neighbours as Gordon "Flakey the Clown" Orchard. He was also briefly a cast member of Rove Live in 2009.

Early life 

Wenzel was born to Harold Wenzel, a grocer who served with the RAAF and Kathleen Wenzel in 1929.  One of eight, he grew up in South Australia suburbs Mile End, Torrensville and Thebarton.  He had an unsettled early life and spent much of his childhood in remand homes run by various organisations including the Christian Brothers and the Salvation Army. Wenzel ran away several times.  At age 14, he left school and joined the Sole Bros. circus as a pony groom and dog trainer. During World War II, he was greatly criticised because of his German sounding surname but nevertheless started acting professionally in 1946 when his first performance in an acting role came at the age of 17 in a comedy stage play. He subsequently appeared in numerous stage plays, musicals, pantomime and children's theatre, including production's of Death of a Salesman, The Crucible, The Imaginary Invalid and Summer of the Seventeenth Doll, he has worked with the Adelaide Festival of the Arts and the South Australian Theatre Company.

Professional career

Television 

After many years in the entertainment industry, primarily in live comedy and theatre, Wenzel appeared on the small screen from the late 1960s including in the drama series Division 4, Matlock Police, Homicide, The Young Doctors, Cop Shop and Certain Women. It was the role in the latter that won him the part of old-fashioned and affable policeman Frank Gilroy, originally a constable later sergeant in A Country Practice, he would appear in the series from its inception in 1981, winning a Silver Logie for his role, later episodes would later eventually see Gilroy retire from the police force to become the local RSL clubs barman and chef, after "Cookie" (Syd Heylen) retired. He also had the guest role playing NSW Police Officer in the series Home Sweet Home with John Bluthal.
Wenzel became very popular with the NSW Police due to his role as Sgt. Gilroy, and was once presented with a leather police jacket from former commissioner John Avery as the fictional country town of Wandin Valley was located in New South Wales.

Film 
He appeared in many Australian films during the 1970s and 1980s including Caddie (1976),  The Odd Angry Shot (1979) and Alison's Birthday (1981) however more recently in the crime thriller in 2014 John Doe: Vigilante.

Theatre 

He appeared in the David Williamson play Travelling North in 2000.

Controversy 

In 2009 Wenzel appeared in a TV ad in the role for a sexual dysfunction therapy. His Sgt. Gilroy (now 80 years old), arrives to save the day when a newlywed wife complains about her husband "speeding" in the sack – and then prosecutes him in court. This ad created much controversy and Wenzel was featured on A Current Affair, defending the advert and stating that he was "an actor and this is what I do" and being thrown into the spotlight after almost 20 years out of it. In May, he appeared on a spoof of the ad that was aired on Rove Live.

A Country Practice re-boot 

Wenzel, as well as Shane Porteous and Joyce Jacobs appeared in the first episode of A Country Practice in November 1981 and stayed with the series until it ended in 1993. However, after the series was cancelled that year by the Seven Network the series was picked by rival Network Ten for a single season in 1994, with a new setting and mostly new cast, Joyce Jacobs was the only original who stayed with the show, with the returning Joan Sydney, Andrew Blackman and briefly Michelle Pettigrove, both Wenzel and Shane Porteous did not reprise their roles in the reboot.

Awards

Personal life 

Wenzel has been married to his English-born wife Linda Wenzel for 67 years.

He is an Australia Day ambassador for the state of Victoria, and a lifelong supporter of the Carlton Football Club.

Brian suffered 2 mini strokes in the last three years

Filmography

References

External links 
 

1929 births
20th-century Australian male actors
Australian male stage actors
Australian male television actors
Australian people of German descent
Australian male film actors
Living people
Logie Award winners
Male actors from Adelaide